Blacksmiths Festival is an annual blacksmith festival held in Ivano-Frankivsk, Ukraine

The festival is one of a number of cultural events that occur in Ivano-Frankivsk and contributed to the city winning the 2018 PACE Europe Prize. The festival was founded by Sergij Polbotko (Ukrainian Union of Blacksmith Artists).

See also
Ironfest (Lithgow)

References

Festivals in Ukraine
Blacksmiths
Metal sculptures
Metalsmiths